Baiyoke Tower I is a skyscraper in Bangkok, Thailand. It was completed in 1987 and was the tallest building in Thailand until 1993, when it was surpassed by Sinn Sathorn Tower. Baiyoke Tower is located in on Ratchaprarop Road in the Pratu Nam area of Ratchathewi District, and houses the Baiyoke Suite Hotel. Its balconies are distinctively painted in rainbow colors and locked for Hotel guests. The rooftop buffet also features some of the best view over bangkok.

Coordinates

References

External links 

 Baiyoke Suite Hotel official website

Skyscrapers in Bangkok
Hotels in Bangkok
Ratchathewi district